Lukoml is a village in Lukoml selsoviet, Chashniki District, Vitsebsk Voblast, Belarus, by the Lukoml Lake.

History
Early references to Lukoml in Russian chronicles are dated by 1078, when it was burned by Vladimir Monomakh. In 15-16th centuries it constituted a separate principality. In 1563 it was burned by Russians. In late Russian Empire it was a shtetl of about 1,000 inhabitants with one Orthodox church, one Catholic church, two synagogues, one school and 8 shops. There are remnants of ancient fortifications by the village.

References

Populated places in Vitebsk Region
Chashniki District
Polochans
Sennensky Uyezd
Villages in Belarus